The Paideia Institute for Humanistic Study is a non-profit educational organization, focused on promoting the studying and appreciation of classical languages.

History 
The institute was founded in 2010 by former students of Fr. Reginald Foster, a longtime Vatican Latinist who taught generations of classicists in Rome. The institute is headquartered in New York but runs programs in Italy, France, Greece, and the United States. Among the other programs of the Institute, Paideia has engaged in outreach efforts for classicists working outside of academia in its "Legion Project", and offers outreach programs to elementary and middle school students (with a special focus on socioeconomically disadvantaged students) at sites in New York including Brooklyn, Queens, and the Bronx, as well as in Philadelphia and Port Chester.

In 2015, Paideia won the Society for Classical Studies' President's Award for its "work in significantly advancing public appreciation and awareness of classical antiquity."

In 2017, the institute founded a humanities magazine "for lovers of the Classics" called In Medias Res. The magazine covers classical literature, language, and culture.

See also
Anthony Grafton
Society for Classical Studies

References

External links
Paideia Institute Website

Educational foundations in the United States
Education companies established in 2010

501(c)(3) organizations
Non-profit organizations based in New York (state)